Şəmətük (also, Shamatuk and Shematuk) is a village and municipality in the Astara Rayon of Azerbaijan.  It has a population of 462.  The municipality consists of the villages of Şəmətük, Sipiyaəlfətik, and Xıçaso.

References 

Populated places in Astara District